Thomas A. Greene (born 1949) is an American politician and pharmacist who served as a member of the Iowa Senate for the 44th district from 2017 to 2021. A Republican, he was elected in 2017. He resides in Burlington, Iowa.

As of February 2017, Greene served on the following committees: Appropriations, Education, Human Resources, Local Government, and Transportation. He also served on the Economic Development Appropriations Subcommittee.

Electoral history

References 

Democratic Party Iowa state senators
Living people
21st-century American politicians
1949 births